Nikolaos "Nikos" Arsenopoulos (born May 19, 2000) is a Greek professional basketball player for Ionikos Nikaias of the Greek Basket League. He is a 1.98 m (6'6") tall and 91 kg (200 lb.) combo guard.

Professional career
In the summer of 2016, Arsenopoulos joined the Greek Basket League and EuroLeague club Olympiacos, when he signed a 6-year contract with the club. He spent the 2016–17 season playing with the junior clubs of Olympiacos. He then made his pro debut during the Greek Basket League's 2017–18 season.

On September 11, 2018, Arsenopoulos was loaned to Psychiko, of the Greek 2nd Division, for the 2018–19 season. He played with Olympiacos' reserve team, Olympiacos B, in the Greek 2nd Division's 2019–20 season. On August 4, 2020, Arsenopoulos was released from the parent club of Olympiacos.

On August 27, 2020, Arsenopoulos signed with Kolossos Rodou. 

On August 18, 2021, Arsenopoulos moved to Ionikos Nikaias. In 19 league games, he averaged 7.2 points, 1.4 rebounds, 0.5 assists and 0.6 steals, playing around 18 minutes per contest. On September 5, 2022, he renewed his contract with Ionikos.

National team career
Arsenopoulos has been a member of the Greek junior national teams. With Greece's junior national teams, he played at the 2016 FIBA Europe Under-16 Championship, the 2017 FIBA Europe Under-18 Championship, the 2018 FIBA Europe Under-18 Championship, and the 2019 FIBA Under-19 World Cup.

References

External links
 Nikos Arsenopoulos at eurobasket.com
 Nikos Arsenopoulos at euroleague.net
 Nikos Arsenopoulos at esake.gr 
 Nikos Arsenopoulos at fiba.com

2000 births
Living people
Greek men's basketball players
Ionikos Nikaias B.C. players
Kolossos Rodou B.C. players
Olympiacos B.C. players
Olympiacos B.C. B players
Point guards
Psychiko B.C. players
Shooting guards
Basketball players from Athens